Cécile Storti (born April 5, 1983 in Évian-les-Bains) is a French cross-country skier who has competed since 2000. Competing in two Winter Olympics, she earned her best finish of sixth in the 4 × 5 km relay at Vancouver in 2010.

Storti's best finish at the FIS Nordic World Ski Championships was ninth in the 4 × 5 km relay at Oberstdorf in 2005.

Her best World Cup finish was fifth at a 4 × 5 km relay in Italy in 2006 while her best individual finish was 19th at a 7.5 km + 7.5 km double pursuit event in Canada in 2009.

Cross-country skiing results
All results are sourced from the International Ski Federation (FIS).

Olympic Games

World Championships

World Cup

Season standings

References

External links
 
 
 
 

1983 births
Living people
People from Évian-les-Bains
French female cross-country skiers
Olympic cross-country skiers of France
Cross-country skiers at the 2006 Winter Olympics
Cross-country skiers at the 2010 Winter Olympics
Sportspeople from Haute-Savoie
21st-century French women